Jay Jackson may refer to:
Jay Jackson (announcer) (1918–2005), television and radio announcer
Jay Jackson (artist) (1905–1954), cartoonist and comic strip illustrator for the Chicago Defender
Jay Jackson (baseball) (b. 1987), professional baseball player
Jay Jaxon (1941–2006), African-American fashion designer